Laurie Anne Helgoe (born December 10, 1960) is an American psychologist with a special interest in the relationship between personality development and culture. In 2008, her writing revealed that scholarly and popular accounts regarding humans who display the personality traits of introversion and extraversion were flawed, and that, instead of representing 25-30% of the population, introverts make up 57% of the population. The identified flaw was a dated reliance on the early work of Isabel Briggs Myers, and the failure to note results of the latest nationally representative surveys using the Myers Briggs Type Indicator (MBTI), a questionnaire used by psychologists to classify human personality traits. Helgoe discussed these findings in the book Introvert Power: Why Your Inner Life is Your Hidden Strength (Sourcebooks, 2008, 2013).

Biography 

Helgoe was born in 1960 in Billings, Montana. Her father is a Lutheran Minister; her mother was a homemaker. Raised as the ninth of ten children, she was surrounded by gregarious siblings and sought out solitude, reflection, and writing to replenish her energy. This early discovery of the power of solitude had a profound influence on her later work. She was educated at Gustavus Adolphus College, St. Peter, Minnesota, and the University of Nevada, Reno. She is married and has two sons.

Helgoe is an associate professor of Behavioral Sciences at the Ross University School of Medicine. Helgoe served as a Clinical Assistant Professor at the West Virginia University School of Medicine and was an assistant professor of Psychology and Social Sciences Division Chair at Davis & Elkins College. Helgoe authors a blog for PsychologyToday.com entitled Introvert Power: Food for the Inner Life. She connects with readers through the Introvert Power and Fragile Bully pages on Facebook.

In 2019, Helgoe explored the relationship between narcissism and American political and interpersonal discourse in her book Fragile Bully: Understanding Our Destructive Affair with Narcissism in the Age of Trump (Diversion Books, 2019). Paul L. Wachtel, Ph.D., distinguished professor at CCNY and integrative psychology theorist, noted that Helgoe's writing provides “seemingly effortless linkage between the intimately psychological and the broader social and cultural” and that “[s]he probes the depth of individual experience, explores the dynamics of couples and families and makes plain how all of this derives both from the powerful impact of our earliest experiences and the equally powerful impact of our current interactions and current social and cultural context.  In her hands, there is no contradiction in this complex web of causality, just a rich tapestry of interwoven threads that create a life.”

Notability 

Publishers Weekly, an American publication which critiques new literature, awarded Helgoe's Introvert Power a starred review. Foreign publishing rights to her books have been sold in Chinese, Finnish, Japanese, Korean, Portuguese and Spanish. Helgoe has written several articles for national publications. She has been profiled or quoted in more than 100 media outlets including the Guardian, Times of India, Inc.com, New York Times, Wall Street Journal and WashingtonPost.com.

References

External links 

Blog by Dr. Helgoe

1960 births
Living people
American women psychologists
21st-century American psychologists
Gustavus Adolphus College alumni
University of Nevada, Reno alumni
20th-century American psychologists